Piroska Molnár (born 1 October 1945) is a Hungarian actress. She has appeared in more than one hundred films since 1967.

Selected filmography

References

External links 

1945 births
Living people
Hungarian film actresses